Nathaniel Buchanan (1826 – 23 September 1901) was an Australian pioneer pastoralist, drover and explorer.

Early life
Buchanan was born near Dublin, and was of Scottish descent the son of Lieutenant Charles Henry Buchanan, and his wife Annie, née White. He arrived in New South Wales with his parents in 1832, and as a young man was part owner with two brothers of Bald Blair station. In 1850 the brothers went to the California Gold Rush, but returned to Australia after a short stay to find that their station had been mismanaged and lost in their absence. During the next few years Buchanan had much experience of overlanding.

Career
In 1859 Buchanan explored new country with William Landsborough, principally on the tributaries of the Fitzroy River, Queensland, when both suffered many privations and were found just in time by a rescue party. Buchanan then joined Landsborough and others as owners of Bowen Downs Station near Longreach, Queensland, which for a time prospered. However, a time came when cattle were almost unsaleable, and the price of wool dropped so low that the station had to be given up and Buchanan was practically penniless.

Buchanan made several explorations inland from Bowen Downs, including securing land near Burketown, Queensland.
They discovered much good new land, part of the Barkly Tableland, and has since carried some of the largest herds in Australia. Throughout the 1870s and 1880s Buchanan did a large amount of pioneering, working principally in northern Queensland and the Northern Territory. Buchanan was also noted for his overlanding feats including droving 20,000 head of cattle from Queensland to Glencoe Station. He had another property, Wave Hill, for a period, but he lost this in 1894 on account of a great fall in cattle prices and the difficulty in getting markets. His son, Gordon Buchanan, had taken up land at Flora valley in 1887 and Buchanan now established this as his headquarters. About two years later, with another man and an aboriginal boy, he started with camels and equipment provided by the South Australian government to find a stock route from northern Queensland. He went from Oodnadatta up the line to Tennant Creek, and then westward to Sturt's Creek. About  from Hooker's Creek he sighted the hills now named Buchanan Hills, and next day came to a branch of Hooker's Creek. Then he went to Hale's Creek and the Sturt, and then to Flora valley. Attempts were made to find a practicable stock route to the west with no success. Returning to Flora Creek he prepared a report for the South Australian government which added much to the knowledge of the country, though Buchanan had failed in his main object. In 1899 Buchanan, now 73 years of age, bought a farm on Dungowan Creek,  from Tamworth and he died there in 1901 still working. Nat was buried in the general cemetery at Walcha, New South Wales. He married in 1863 Catherine Gordon who survived him, along with a son.

Legacy
Buchanan was a great bushman and a good explorer. He knew the country from northern Queensland to Western Australia very well. He rarely made much money for himself though he was a pioneer on Bowen Downs, on the Barkly Tableland, on the Roper River, and on the Victoria River, and pioneered the trail from the Kimberleys towards Perth. When he died, he owned almost no land, but he made possibilities for other men who in many cases reaped where he had sown. His brother William had also been a significant pastoralist pioneer.

References

Sally O'Neill, 'Buchanan, Nathaniel (Nat) (1826 - 1901)', Australian Dictionary of Biography, Volume 3, MUP, 1969, pp 284–285.

1826 births
1901 deaths
Australian people of Scottish descent
Australian explorers
Australian pastoralists
Australian stockmen
19th-century Australian businesspeople